Perroni is a surname and may refer to:

 Gloria María Perroni (born 1943), Mexican politician from the National Action Party
 Maite Perroni (born 1983), Mexican actress, model and singer/songwriter

Italian-language surnames
Spanish-language surnames